The Independent Workers Union of Ireland is a trade union in Ireland with its headquarters in Cork City. It was formed by Irish workers dissatisfied with the trade union movement in Ireland which it states, has "become nothing more than an arm of the state and management." It has over 1,000 paying members organised in 7 Branches in Ireland and is affiliated to the ideals of early Irish trade unionists such as James Connolly and Jim Larkin. It is not affiliated to the main Trade Union Umbrella body the ICTU.

The IWU and its members campaigned against the Treaty of Lisbon and continue to campaign vigorously against austerity measures.

References

External links 

IWU Youth Bebo page

Trade unions in the Republic of Ireland
Trade unions established in 2002
National trade union centres of Ireland
All-Ireland organisations